Liaoyang County is a county in east-central Liaoning province in Northeast China. It is under the administration of Liaoyang City, located in between the urban area of Liaoyang City and Anshan City.

Administrative divisions
There are 14 towns, one township, and three townships in the county.

Towns:
Shoushan, Mujia, Lanjia, Liuhao, Xiaotun, Shaling, Bahui, Tangmazhai, Hanling, Helan, Xiaobeihe, Liu'erbao, Huangniwa, Longchang

Townships: 
Xiadahe Township, Tianshui Manchu Ethnic Township, Jidongyu Manchu Ethnic Township

References

External links

County-level divisions of Liaoning
Liaoyang